The 2011 Colorado Springs mayoral election took place on May 17 and April 5, 2011, to elect the mayor of Colorado Springs, Colorado. The election was held concurrently with various other local elections. The election was officially nonpartisan.

This was the first mayor to elect a mayor of Colorado Springs to function under the strong mayor style of governance.

Results

First round

Runoff

References

2011
2011 Colorado elections
2011 United States mayoral elections